Lucian Mihail Dobre (born 25 September 1978) is a former Romanian professional footballer who played as a defender for teams such as CSM Reșița, Astra Ploiești, Petrolul Ploiești, FC U Craiova, Zimbru Chișinău, Dacia Chișinău or Farul Constanța, among others.

In 2022, was appointed as the new head coach of the Liga III side Voința Lupac.

References

External links
 
 
 

1978 births
Living people
Sportspeople from Reșița
Romanian footballers
Association football defenders
Liga I players
Liga II players
Liga III players
CSM Reșița players
FC Astra Giurgiu players
FC Petrolul Ploiești players
FC U Craiova 1948 players
FCV Farul Constanța players
Moldovan Super Liga players
FC Zimbru Chișinău players
FC Iskra-Stal players
FC Dacia Chișinău players
Ukrainian Premier League players
SC Tavriya Simferopol players
Russian Premier League players
PFC Spartak Nalchik players
Romanian expatriate footballers
Expatriate footballers in Moldova
Romanian expatriate sportspeople in Moldova
Expatriate footballers in Russia
Romanian expatriate sportspeople in Russia
Expatriate footballers in Ukraine
Romanian expatriate sportspeople in Ukraine
Romanian football managers
CSM Reșița managers